Apochinomma is a genus of corinnid sac spiders first described by P. Pavesi in 1881.

Species
 it contains sixteen species:
Apochinomma acanthaspis Simon, 1896 – Brazil
Apochinomma armatum Mello-Leitão, 1922 – Brazil
Apochinomma bilineatum Mello-Leitão, 1939 – Brazil
Apochinomma constrictum Simon, 1896 – Brazil
Apochinomma dacetonoides Mello-Leitão, 1948 – Guyana
Apochinomma decepta Haddad, 2013 – Mozambique, South Africa
Apochinomma dolosum Simon, 1897 – India
Apochinomma elongata Haddad, 2013 – Tanzania, Malawi, Botswana
Apochinomma formica Simon, 1896 – Brazil
Apochinomma formicaeforme Pavesi, 1881 (type) – West, Central, East, Southern Africa
Apochinomma formicoides Mello-Leitão, 1939 – Brazil
Apochinomma malkini Haddad, 2013 – Nigeria
Apochinomma myrmecioides Mello-Leitão, 1922 – Brazil
Apochinomma nitidum (Thorell, 1895) – India, Myanmar, Thailand, Indonesia (Borneo, Sulawesi)
Apochinomma parva Haddad, 2013 – Guinea
Apochinomma pyriforme (Keyserling, 1891) – Brazil

References

Araneomorphae genera
Corinnidae
Spiders of Africa
Spiders of Asia
Spiders of South America